Plenoculus is a genus of square-headed wasps in the family Crabronidae. There are more than 20 described species in Plenoculus.

Species
These 21 species belong to the genus Plenoculus:

 Plenoculus beaumonti de Andrade, 1957
 Plenoculus boharti F. Williams, 1960
 Plenoculus boregensis F. Williams, 1960
 Plenoculus cockerellii W. Fox, 1894
 Plenoculus cuneatus F. Williams, 1960
 Plenoculus davisi W. Fox, 1893
 Plenoculus deserti F. Williams, 1960
 Plenoculus fremonti Parker in Parker & Griswold, 1984
 Plenoculus gillaspyi Krombein, 1938
 Plenoculus hurdi F. Williams, 1960
 Plenoculus mexicanus F. Williams, 1960
 Plenoculus murgabensis (Gussakovskij, 1928)
 Plenoculus palmarum F. Williams, 1960
 Plenoculus parvus W. Fox, 1897
 Plenoculus platycerus Menke, 1968
 Plenoculus propinquus W. Fox, 1894
 Plenoculus sinuatus F. Williams, 1960
 Plenoculus stygius F. Williams, 1960
 Plenoculus timberlakei F. Williams, 1960
 Plenoculus ute Griswold in Parker & Griswold, 1984
 Plenoculus vanharteni Schmid-Egger, 2011

References

Crabronidae
Articles created by Qbugbot